The White Horse is an oil on canvas landscape painting by the English artist John Constable. It was completed in 1819 and is now in the Frick Collection in New York City.

The painting marked a vital turning point in the artist's career. It was the first in a series of six so called ‘Six-Footers’, depicting scenes on the River Stour, which includes his celebrated work The Hay Wain. The subject of the painting is a tow-horse being ferried across the river in Flatford, just below the Lock, at a point where the towpath switches banks.

History

The painting was completed and exhibited at the Royal Exhibition in 1819, where it was well received. Constable was voted an Associate of the Royal Academy on the strength of it. The painting was purchased for 100 guineas by Constables friend John Fisher, the Bishop of Salisbury, who would later commission his painting Salisbury Cathedral from the Bishop's Grounds. This purchase finally provided Constable with financial security and it’s arguable that without it, he may have given up painting altogether.

The White Horse was one of Constable’s favourite paintings. He commented in a letter to Fisher in 1826:

In 1830, when Fisher was heavily indebted, he bought the painting back, also for 100 guineas. He would keep it for the rest of his life. After his death in 1837, the painting passed through the hands of various English collectors, before being brought to the United States by financier J. P. Morgan.

The full-size oil sketch for The White Horse is held by the National Gallery of Art in Washington, D.C.

See also
 Stratford Mill
 The Hay Wain
 The Lock

References

Bibliography

External links 
The Frick Collection

Paintings by John Constable
Paintings in the Frick Collection
1819 paintings
Horses in art
Water in art
England in art